Red Dog: True Blue is a 2016 Australian family comedy film directed by Kriv Stenders, written by Daniel Taplitz and starring Jason Isaacs, Levi Miller and Bryan Brown. It is a prequel to the 2011 film Red Dog, detailing the early days of the Red Dog, the Pilbara Wanderer.

Red Dog was played in the first film by Koko, but after Koko's death he was replaced with Phoenix. A documentary about the life of Koko titled Koko: A Red Dog Story was released in 2019. It was also dedicated to his memory.

Premise
An iconic Australian story of family, friendship and adventure, between a young boy and a scrappy one-of-a-kind dog that would grow up to become an Australian legend.

Cast
 Magdelina Bowie as Red Dog
 Levi Miller as Mick
 Jason Isaacs as Michael Carter
 Bryan Brown as Grandpa
 Calen Tassone as Taylor Pete 
 Hanna Mangan-Lawrence as Betty Marble
 Thomas Cocquerel as Bill Stemple 
 Kee Chan as Jimmy Umbrella
 Steve Le Marquand as Little John
 Justine Clarke as Diane Carter 
 Zen McGrath as Theo Carter

Production
Filming began early in 2015 and was released on Boxing Day in 2016.

Reception
Red Dog: True Blue has a 100% approval rating on Rotten Tomatoes based on reviews from 13 critics.

The film grossed $5,218,716 at the Australian box office, a quarter of the original film's takings.

Accolades
Geoffrey Hall was nominated for Best Cinematography at the 7th AACTA Awards.

Spin-off
A spin-off documentary, titled Koko: A Red Dog Story was released in 2019. The film explores the life of Koko, who was cast as Red Dog in the original film.

References

External links
 Red Dog: True Blue official site
 Red Dog: True Blue at Internet Movie Database
 Red Dog: True Blue at Rotten Tomatoes

2016 films
2016 comedy films
Australian comedy films
Films scored by Cezary Skubiszewski
Films directed by Kriv Stenders
Films produced by Nelson Woss
Films about dogs
Films about horses
Films set in 1969
Films set in 2011
Films set in Western Australia
Films set in the Outback
Films set in the 20th century
Films set in the 21st century
Self-reflexive films
2010s English-language films
Screen Australia films
Roadshow Entertainment films